Amarin may refer to:

Amarin Corporation, an Irish-American biopharmaceutical company
Amarinus, a Roman Catholic saint associated with Saint Praejectus
Saint-Amarin, a commune in France (named after the saint)
Amarin Group, a Thai media and publishing company
Amarin TV, a television channel in Thailand, owned by Amarin Group
Amarin Plaza, a shopping mall in Thailand
Amarin Plaza Company, a former name of The Erawan Group, a Thai hospitality company
Wat Amarinthraram, a Buddhist temple in Thailand